Cosmopolitan Life is an album by Russian singer and composer Leonid Agutin, featuring Grammy-winning American guitarist Al Di Meola, released in 2005. It has been released with different track listings by SPV and Ole.

After release of the album in 2005, Di Meola and Agutin performed together live in the USA (Blue Note), Russia, Switzerland (Montreux Jazz Festival), Italy ("Italiani nel Mondo"), and other countries.

Track listing

All songs written by Leonid Agutin and Alex Sino. 
 "Cuba Africa" – 5:34
 "Cosmopolitan Life" – 4:09
 "Nobody" – 4:47
 "Price to Learn" – 5:27
 "Tango" – 3:54
 "Smile" – 4:19
 "Portofino" – 3:37
 "If I'll Get a Chance" – 4:07
 "Blue River" – 4:44
 "Shade of Your World" – 6:16

External links
 Press release "Cosmopolitan Live"
 Al Di Meola - official website 
 Leonid Agutin - official press lelease

2005 albums
Al Di Meola albums
Leonid Agutin albums
Collaborative albums